ACT, or Automated Confirmation of Transactions, is a system for reporting and clearing trades in the over-the-counter (OTC) and NASDAQ securities markets. In contrast to Qualified Special Representative (QSR) clearing via the National Securities Clearing Corporation (NSCC), which requires multiple relationships between brokers, dealers, and clearing firms, ACT facilitates and simplifies the process of clearing by providing a single counterparty to interact with.

ACT offers a risk management system that allows clearing firms to monitor the activity of their clients. This tool is unique within the clearing business.

The Financial Industry Regulatory Authority (FINRA) also refers to ACT as the Trade Reporting Facility (TRF).

External links 
 NASDAQ website
 Investopedia on ACT

Nasdaq
Electronic trading systems
Year of introduction missing